WDEX (1430 kHz) is an AM radio station in Monroe, North Carolina.  The station is owned by New Life Community Temple of Faith, Inc. along with WADE 1340 AM in Wadesboro, North Carolina.  The two stations simulcast a radio format of urban gospel music along with Christian talk and teaching programs.

WDEX is powered at 2,500 watts, using a directional antenna at all times.

History
WDEX signed on in December 1982 with an adult contemporary format. For a time it was owned by Ford Broadcasting and shared much of its programming with WRNA, WRKB and WLTC, which aired Southern gospel music along with preaching.

References

External links

DEX
Radio stations established in 1982
Gospel radio stations in the United States
1982 establishments in North Carolina